The 1963 LSU Tigers football team represented Louisiana State University during the 1963 NCAA University Division football season.

The Battle for the Rag, the annual rivalry game vs. Tulane, was played as scheduled, one of the few games not to be postponed or canceled following the assassination of President John F. Kennedy. The contest kicked off approximately 25 hours after the tragedy in Dallas. It was the second of three consecutive Tiger shutouts vs. the Green Wave at Baton Rouge.

Schedule

References

LSU
LSU Tigers football seasons
LSU Tigers football